La Paz is a small city in the Canelones Department, southern Uruguay. 

La Paz is also the name of the municipality to which the city belongs.

Geography
It belongs to the wider Montevideo Metropolitan Area.

History 
The first Spanish inhabitants settled here in 1758, when the land was distributed to settlers for development. The railroad arrived here in 1868. The village of La Paz was founded on 28 February 1872, its name as a homage to the "Revolution of the Lances" (1870-1872). At the time it was a middle-class resort. The only Jewish cemetery of the country was created here in 1917.

On 15 May 1925, its status was elevated to "Villa" (town) by the Act of Ley Nº 7.837, while on 19 December 1957 it was further elevated to "Ciudad" (city) by the Act of Ley Nº 12.477.

The area was known for its vineyards, wine cellars and agroindustry. There were marble and granite quarries, used for the development of Montevideo and Buenos Aires, in Argentina. These quarries brought many Italian immigrants to the area. The exploitation of granite is still active. The city is also known for its meat industry.

Population 
According to the 2011 census, La Paz has a population of 20,524. In 2010, the Intendencia de Canelones had estimated a population of 23,500 for the municipality during the elections.

 
Source: Instituto Nacional de Estadística de Uruguay

Places of worship
 Nuestra Señora de La Paz, La Paz Church (Roman Catholic)

Government 
The city mayor as of July 2010 is Juan Tons.

References

External links 

INE map of La Paz, Barrio Cópola, Costa y Guillamón, Villa Paz S.A. and Barrio La Lucha

Populated places in the Canelones Department
Populated places established in 1872
1872 establishments in Uruguay